Antisocial may refer to:

Sociology, psychiatry and psychology
Anti-social behaviour
Antisocial personality disorder
Psychopathy
Conduct disorder

Law
Anti-social Behaviour Act 2003
Anti-Social Behaviour Order
Crime and Disorder Act 1998
Public order crime

Popular culture
"Antisocial" (Trust song), 1980
"Antisocial" (Ed Sheeran and Travis Scott song), 2019
Antisocial (album), a 2000 album by Turn
"Antisocial", a 2010 song by Gucci Mane on Burrrprint 2
Antisocial, a song by Migos and Juice WRLD from Culture III, 2021
Antisocial (film), a 2013 Canadian sci-fi horror film
Anti-Social (film), a 2015 Hungarian-British crime film
"Anti-social", a 'minisode' from Talking Tom and Friends

Books
Antisocial: Online Extremists, Techno-Utopians, and the Hijacking of the American Conversation, the 2019 book from Andrew Marantz

See also
Anti-socialism
Asociality, a lack of motivation for social interaction, or preference for solitary activities
Deviance, actions or behaviors that violate social norms
Misanthropy